Shakuntala is a 1945 Nepali epic poem written by Laxmi Prasad Devkota and published by Sajha Publications. It is considered to be one of the greatest works of Laxmi Prasad Devkota and indeed of the entire Nepali literature.

Introduction
The epic is based on the classical play Shakuntala by ancient Sanskrit poet Kālidāsa. It is considered the first original epic in the Nepali language. Although it is based on an ancient work, the work has sufficient originality to be considered as such, specially compared to the first Nepali epic Bhanubhakta Ramayana which was a translation of Valmiki Ramayana. It was published in 1945. Devkota took just three months to complete the entire epic.

Translation
Laxmi Prasad Devkota translated the epic into English himself. It was published posthumously in 1991.

Adaptations
Shakuntala has been adapted into a play and performed by the students of Bidya Shankar School under the guidance of Sunil Pokharel, the director of Aroha Gurukul.

References

Bibliography
“Shakuntala.” A Survey of Nepali Literature in English. (M. Phil. Course Packet. Unit 1: Poetry). Kathmandu: IACER, 2006. 45-57.

1945 poems
Epic poems in Nepali
Works based on Shakuntala (play)
Works based on the Mahabharata
Nepalese books
20th-century Nepalese books
Nepalese epics
Nepali-language books